Skin of the Earth is the second full-length album release by the Dutch symphonic metal band Kingfisher Sky.

Track listing

Personnel
Judith Rijnveld - female vocals
Ivar de Graaf - drums, additional guitars and keyboards
Eric Hoogendoorn - bass
Edo van der Kolk - electric and acoustic guitars
Chris Henny - guitar
Maaike Peterse - violin, cello
David Gutiérrez Rojas - keyboards
Hans Pieter, Eric Hoogendoorn - mixing, mastering
Joke Rijnveld-Stortenbeek - artwork
Joke Rijnveld-Stortenbeek, Mark A. Drillich, Richard Hilgeman - kay-out
Richard Hilgeman - photography
Richard Hilgeman, Judith Rijnveld - lay-out photography

References

2010 albums